Chislehurst Common is an open space in Chislehurst in the London Borough of Bromley in south-east London. It is jointly managed with St Paul's Cray Common.

The common was used for cricket matches in the 18th century. It was the home venue of Chislehurst Cricket Club which played several known matches against London Cricket Club from 1738 to 1741. Cricket is still played on Chislehurst Common as the Chislehurst and West Kent Cricket Club has its ground in the south-west corner of the common on Cricket Ground Road.

Cricket venue

The earliest known use of Chislehurst Common for top-class cricket was in July 1738 when Chislehurst played London in a game that "turned several times" until finally being won by London. The venue was subsequently used in June 1740 for another Chislehurst v. London match, again won by London.  It was the intended venue for a Kent side to play London match on 26 June 1741 that was rained off.

The Chislehurst club declined after 1741. The Common was used in 1752 when a Kent side played a Surrey team although it was used occasionally for cricket during the 19th and 20th centuries.

References

External links
 Chislehurst and St Paul's Cray Commons

1738 establishments in England
Cricket grounds in Kent
Defunct cricket grounds in England
Defunct sports venues in Kent
English cricket venues in the 18th century
History of Kent
Parks and open spaces in the London Borough of Bromley
Sports venues completed in 1738